The Alabama Community College System (ACCS) is the system of public community colleges in the U.S. state of Alabama. It consists of 24 community and technical colleges in the state which offer 2-to-4-year transfer, dual enrollment, technical training, adult education, and community education.

The Alabama Community College System was founded 1963 when the public two-year colleges in Alabama were linked into a single system governed by the State Board of Education. The system was separated from the State Board of Education and put under control of the Department of Postsecondary Education in 1982.

Institutions

References

External links
 

Community colleges in Alabama